Lance Anthony O'Sullivan  (born 28 August 1963 in New Zealand) is a Thoroughbred horse trainer and former champion jockey in New Zealand.

Lance is the son of premiership winning horse trainer Dave O’Sullivan and the brother of Paul O'Sullivan.

Riding career

Lance O’Sullivan’s first ride was on 12 June 1980 when he rode Her Highness to win the Arapuni Handicap at Te Awamutu, a horse trained by his father.

O'Sullivan retired from riding in 2003 with a record 2358 New Zealand winners. In addition to this total he rode a further 121 winners offshore in places as diverse as Australia, Hong Kong, Japan, Macau, Singapore and Turkey. When he retired O'Sullivan was credited with winning: 12 New Zealand Jockey's Premierships (a record), having broken Bill Broughton's long-standing record of 11 and 62 GP1 winners.
His biggest win as a jockey was the 1989 Japan Cup on champion mare Horlicks, breaking the world record for 2400m.

Despite a number of attempts O'Sullivan was never quite able to win the Race That Stops The Nation: the Melbourne Cup. He came agonisingly close in 1985 when run down in the final few strides on Koiro Corrie May by What A Nuisance. He was also jockey of Waverley Star, who was unfortunate to run into the champion Bonecrusher, in the 1986 Cox Plate. Dubbed the "Race of the Century" Waverley Star finished a gallant second, after a 2 horse war with Bonecrusher from the 800m, only succumbing to the champion in the last few strides. He did achieve redemption, courtesy of Surfers Paradise, the previous seasons New Zealand Derby winner, who looped the field on the home turn to win the 1991 running of the Cox Plate.

In the 2003 New Year Honours, O'Sullivan was appointed an Officer of the New Zealand Order of Merit, for services to thoroughbred racing.

In 2006, O'Sullivan was part of the inaugural class inducted in the New Zealand Racing Hall of Fame.

Training career

Lance O'Sullivan's father, Dave, founded the Wexford Stables at Matamata. Lance's brother, Paul, trained in partnership with their father before moving to Hong Kong Jockey Club in 2004.

Starting in the 2006–07 season Lance O'Sullivan has trained in partnership with Andrew Scott who previously worked in partnership with Mike Moroney at Ballymore Stables.

Key successes include:

 Asterix - winner of the 2022 New Zealand Derby. 
 Dark Destroyer - winner of the 2022 Tarzino Trophy
 Rocket Spade - winner of the 2021 New Zealand Derby.
 Force of Will - winner of the 2021 Desert Gold Stakes.
 Rocket Spade - winner of the 2021 Auckland Guineas. 
 Dragon Leap - winner of the 2020 Auckland Guineas.
 Pentane - winner of the 2006 Auckland Cup
 Summer Passage - winner of the 2017 Sistema Stakes. 
 Willie Cazals - winner of the 2016 Spring Classic (Livamol Classic).
 Pure Champion - winner of the 2014 Windsor Park Plate.

See also 

 Thoroughbred racing in New Zealand
 Jim Cassidy
 Shane Dye
 Noel Harris
 Chris Johnson
 Michael Walker

References

External links
 Profile of Lance O'Sullivan at Wexford Stables

1963 births
Living people
New Zealand jockeys
New Zealand Racing Hall of Fame inductees
Officers of the New Zealand Order of Merit
New Zealand racehorse trainers